Trestolone acetate (developmental code names CDB-903, NSC-69948, U-15614; also known as 7α-methyl-19-nortestosterone 17β-acetate (MENT acetate) and 7α-methylestr-4-en-17β-ol-3-one 17β-acetate) is a synthetic and injected anabolic–androgenic steroid (AAS) and a derivative of nandrolone (19-nortestosterone) which was never marketed. It is an androgen ester – specifically, the C17 acetate ester of trestolone (7α-methyl-19-nortestosterone; MENT). The medication was first described in 1963.

See also
 List of androgen esters

References

Abandoned drugs
Acetate esters
Androgen esters
Androgens and anabolic steroids
Estranes
Ketones
Prodrugs
Progestogens
Synthetic estrogens
World Anti-Doping Agency prohibited substances